Pilar Montoya Manzano (1960 – 6 March 2015), known as La Faraona, was a Spanish Romani flamenco dancer.

Biography
Pilar Montoya was born in Seville in 1960, the eldest daughter of dancer  and singer Enriqueta Reyes. She grew up in a family atmosphere where flamenco dancing and singing were deeply ingrained. In her dances, she was known for bulerías of great precision, and especially for tangos "with a touch of mischief and the canastero seal" in the family's style, to which she added her own stamp. At age 15 she began to accompany her father, in all the shows that he mounted, including the Broadway tour of Flamenco Puro, along with Concha Vargas and other flamenco stars. "La Faraona", as Montoya became known, went on to appear in Andalucía Flamenca and Persecución as a soloist.

In 2006, she co-starred with her sister Rosario in Gitanas at the Mont-de-Marsan Festival in France. She appeared in several shows with her nephew , including Alma Vieja at her last Bienal de Flamenco of Seville in 2014.

In addition to performing, in her later years, Pilar Montoya taught courses and seminars on flamenco dancing at Seville's Flamencos por el Mundo academy.

She died in Seville on 6 March 2015 after a long illness, weeks after making her last public appearance on 24 February, presenting Mi Herencia with her sister Rosario, as part of the flamenco cycle Viene del Sur at Seville's . Her son Juan "El Barullo" Fernández has continued the family tradition, winning an award at the 2015 .

Style
On the occasion of a tribute to Pilar Montoya by her nephew Farruquito, Europa Press described her style:

References

1960 births
2015 deaths
20th-century Spanish dancers
21st-century Spanish dancers
Flamenco dancers
People from Seville
Romani dancers
Spanish female dancers
Spanish Romani people
20th-century Spanish women